The Roman Catholic Diocese of Satu Mare, Romania was established on 23 March 1804 by Francis I, King of Hungary, an act recognised by Pope Pius VII that 9 August. At the time, the diocese was part of the Kingdom of Hungary and covered a larger territory, including land in present-day Hungary and Slovakia as well as Romania. It was constituted in its present form on 18 October 1982, when the Communist regime split it from the Oradea Mare Diocese.

The diocese has 48 parishes with 90,000 adherents. It covers the counties of Satu Mare and Maramureş, of which 8.2% are Roman Catholic, with concentrations in Satu Mare County along the Hungarian border. Its adherents are predominantly Hungarians, with a small number of Zipser Germans. It is subordinate to the Bucharest Archdiocese. Its bishop since 2003 has been Jenő Schönberger.

References

External links
 Official site

 
Roman Catholic dioceses in Romania